Vegas National Forest was established in Nevada on December 12, 1907 with . On July 1, 1908 it was absorbed by Moapa National Forest and the name was discontinued. The lands exist presently as part of Toiyabe National Forest.

References

External links
Forest History Society
Forest History Society:Listing of the National Forests of the United States Text from Davis, Richard C., ed. Encyclopedia of American Forest and Conservation History. New York: Macmillan Publishing Company for the Forest History Society, 1983. Vol. II, pp. 743-788.

Former National Forests of Nevada
Humboldt–Toiyabe National Forest
1907 establishments in Nevada
Protected areas established in 1907
1908 disestablishments in Nevada
Protected areas disestablished in 1908